Ninoslav Pavelić (born 1 June 1973) is a Croatian handball goalkeeping coach, who is currently working as a goalkeeping coach of Croatia men's national handball team.

Living people
1973 births
Croatian handball coaches